Minayevsky is a rural locality (a khutor) in Tryasinovskoye Rural Settlement, Serafimovichsky District, Volgograd Oblast, Russia. The population was 7 as of 2010.

Geography 
Minayevsky is located 31 km northeast of Serafimovich (the district's administrative centre) by road. Tryasinovsky is the nearest rural locality.

References 

Rural localities in Serafimovichsky District